Burak Fırat (born 1 January 1993 in Barcelona) is a Turkish chess player who received the FIDE title of Grandmaster (GM) in 2017. Fırat is the eleventh player to become a grandmaster in Turkish chess history. He previously received the FIDE Master (FM) title in 2009 and International Master (IM) in 2010.

References

External links 

 
 

1993 births
Living people
Turkish chess players
Chess grandmasters
People from Barcelona